Abraham Rajan (born 1958) is an Indian ex-athlete who is currently a coach with Sports Authority of India (Sports Authority of India) and the Sports Development Authority of Tamil Nadu at the Jawaharlal Nehru Stadium facilities.

Career and achievements 
Abraham Rajan won the gold in the 800m at the 1981 Asian Athletics Championships with a time of 1:50.21. This was the crowning achievement of his athletics career which also included performances at the national and collegiate level. His 800m time is still a record for engineering colleges in Tamil Nadu.

References

1958 births
Indian male middle-distance runners
Living people
People from Tamil Nadu
Athletes from Tamil Nadu